Gamochaeta is a genus of flowering plants in the family Asteraceae. There has not always been agreement among botanists regarding its status as a recognized genus, but it has become more accepted in recent years. It currently includes many plants that previously belonged in genus Gnaphalium. Like many species of Gnaphalium, many Gamochaeta are called cudweeds or everlastings.

Gamochaeta are native to North and South America, with one species endemic to Tristan da Cunha in the South Atlantic. Some species are found in other regions as introduced species outside of their native ranges, and sometimes as invasive noxious weeds.

Plants of this genus have "relatively small heads in spiciform (spike-like) arrays, concave post-fruiting receptacles, truncate collecting appendages of style branches in bisexual florets, relatively small cypselae (fruits) with minute, mucilage-producing papilliform hairs on the faces, and pappus bristles basally connate (joined) in smooth rings and released as single units."

 Species

References

Asteraceae genera